Oreophryne furu is a species of microhylid frogs endemic to the Mamberamo River basin in Papua, Western New Guinea. It is distinguished from other related species by its small size, unique call and egg-guarding behaviour.

Discovery 
O. furu was first collected in 2000 during a Conservation International biodiversity survey, and formally described in 2009 by Rainer Günther, Stephen Richards, Burhan Tjaturadi and Djoko Iskandar. It was found in the lowland rainforest ( above sea level) near the Mamberamo River of Western New Guinea. The specific name derives from the Furu River, a small tributary of the Mamberamo River.

Description and behaviour 
Length of collected males (from tip of snout to distal tip of urostyle bone) ranged between 20.5 and 23.3 mm, and one female was 24.7 mm. The dorsal and lateral sides are pale grey with variously scattered dark brown pigmentation, and a whitish mask on the snout. The ventral side is whitish and sometimes speckled with dark dots.

A male was observed guarding eggs glued to the underside of a leaf by straddling them, probably to provide moisture and avoid egg desiccation. This behaviour has been observed in only one other (undescribed) Oreophryne species. It advertises for mates with an infrequent, loud, harsh rattle that lasts about two seconds.

Habitat and conservation 
Oreophryne furu is known from lowland rainforest adjacent to a river. The female and the egg-guarding male were on the forest floor. Although only known from a single location, this location is within the Mamberamo Foja Wildlife Reserve, a protected area. Moreover, the location is nested within a large area of undisturbed habitat.

References

furu
Amphibians of Western New Guinea
Endemic fauna of Indonesia
Endemic fauna of New Guinea
Amphibians described in 2009
Taxa named by Rainer Günther
Taxa named by Stephen J. Richards